James Paterson (15 June 1905 – 30 December 1978) was a Scottish footballer who played as an inside forward.

Career
Born in Cowdenbeath into a family with links to Stirlingshire, Paterson played club football for Camelon Juniors, Everton (no senior appearances), St Johnstone, Cowdenbeath, Leicester City, Reading, Clapton Orient and made three appearances for Scotland in 1931.

References

1905 births
1978 deaths
Scottish footballers
Scotland international footballers
St Johnstone F.C. players
Everton F.C. players
Cowdenbeath F.C. players
Leicester City F.C. players
Reading F.C. players
Leyton Orient F.C. players
Association football inside forwards
English Football League players
Scottish Football League players
Camelon Juniors F.C. players
Scottish Junior Football Association players
People from Cowdenbeath
Footballers from Fife
Footballers from Stirling (council area)